You'll Be Back is a 2002 Spanish-Mexican film written and directed by Antonio Chavarrías based on the novel Un enano español se suicida en Las Vegas by Francisco Casavella. It stars Tristán Ulloa and Unax Ugalde alongside Elizabeth Cervantes and Joana Rañé.

Plot 
Architecture student Ignacio puts aside his studies and his plans to move to Los Angeles upon meeting again with his elder brother Carlos, grappling with ludomania. He also develops a mutual attraction with Carlos' Mexican girlfriend Marta.

Cast

Production 
An adaptation of Francisco Casavella's novel Un español se suicida en Las Vegas, the screenplay was written by Antonio Chavarrías. The film is a Spanish-Mexican coproduction by Oberon Cinematográfica, Altavista Films, Moro Films, with the participation of TVE, Canal+, and TVC. Shooting locations included Barcelona.

Release 
Distributed by Lauren Film, the film was theatrically released in Spain on 4 October 2002. The release in Mexico was set for 20 June 2003.

Reception 
Jonathan Holland of Variety deemed the film to be "too low-key for its own good", an "engaging slice-of-life fable which simmers nicely but never boils".

 of Fotogramas rated You'll Be Back 3 out of 5 stars, deeming it to be "a film as thoughtful as it is dramatically effective", highlighting Ugalde's performance as the best thing about the film.

Accolades 

|-
| align = "center" | 2003 || 17th Goya Awards || Best Adapted Screenplay || Antonio Chavarrías ||  || 
|-
| rowspan = "3" align = "center" | 2004 || rowspan = "3" | 46th Ariel Awards || Best Supporting Actor || Tristán Ulloa ||  || rowspan = "3" | 
|-
| Best Adapted Screenplay || Antonio Chavarrías || 
|-
| Best Cinematography || Guillermo Granillo || 
|}

See also 
 List of Spanish films of 2002
 List of Mexican films of 2003

References 

2000s Spanish films
2000s Mexican films
2000s Spanish-language films
2002 drama films
Spanish drama films
Mexican drama films
Films based on Spanish novels
Films shot in Barcelona